Rum Junction is an unincorporated community in Logan County, West Virginia, United States.

References 

Unincorporated communities in West Virginia
Unincorporated communities in Logan County, West Virginia
Populated places on the Guyandotte River